The Apmi is a river of central western New Britain, in Papua New Guinea.

References

Rivers of New Britain